Coleophora remotella is a moth of the family Coleophoridae. It is found in Russia (Ussuri).

References

remotella
Moths of Asia
Moths described in 1976